{{DISPLAYTITLE:C2H4OS}}
The molecular formula C2H4OS (molar mass: 76.11 g/mol, exact mass: 75.9983 u) may refer to:

 Ethylene episulfoxide
 Thioacetic acid